Standard Publishing is a nondenominational Christian publishing company associated with the Restoration Movement. It was founded in Cincinnati, Ohio, in 1872. Major publications have included its flagship journal, Christian Standard, and church education materials including Vacation Bible School curricula. 

In 2015, Standard Publishing became an imprint of David C. Cook when the latter acquired the company's Bible lesson commentary series, Sunday school curriculum and other church resources. The company's remaining assets, including Christian Standard, The Lookout, and digital resources for churches, are now produced under the name Christian Standard Media.

Founding
The founding of Standard Publishing parallels the history of the Restoration Movement. Isaac Errett, Herbert Moninger, J. D. Murch, Lillie Faris, Guy P. Leavitt, C. P. Sharp, P. H. Welshimer, W. R. Walker, and Burris Butler were all editors, publishers, and contributors and were all leaders of the Restoration Movement (1790-1825).

Printing history

A two-story building at Ninth and Cutter Streets was purchased in 1914. The Ferro Construction Company erected the company's building at Eighth and Cutter Streets, reported to be the first concrete and steel building put up west of Pittsburgh.

That year the company began to do color printing, which was new at that time. Also established was an engraving division known as the Sterling Engraving Company. In 1945, a new building at Parkway and Jackson Streets, was purchased to house the company's expanded offices. A bookstore opened in 1947.

In 1955, the company moved to a new, air-conditioned plant in Mount Healthy, a northern suburb of Cincinnati.

This single-story plant occupied about seven acres and housed composing, preliminary, printing, binding, and mailing operations. The printing plant included several web as well as large sheetfed presses including a press to apply felt backing to cut-out figures creating flannelgraph sets.

In 1973, the company's printing plant consumed 27,500,000 pounds of paper and more than 400,000 pounds of ink.

The company eventually moved out of the printing business and relocated to its current office complex just north of Cincinnati.

Publications

The company has published Uniform Lessons in a variety of formats since that time. In 1954, this material was presented in an annual bound volume, The Standard Lesson Commentary. It continues today in various editions annually. Early examples of age-appropriate journals included Sunday School Standard, Boy’s Life, and Girlhood Days.

Today all ages of study are represented. Standard Lesson is adult Bible study materials for Sunday school, small groups or personal studies. Encounter offers Sunday school curriculum for junior high and high school teens. 40 Instant Studies caters to small group topical Bible studies for teens. For younger children, Standard Publishing publishes HeartShaper Sunday school curriculum for ages 1 – 12; 13 Very Series for small group Bible studies ages 3 – 12; Route 52 a Bible study curriculum for ages 3 – 12, CAMP - large group event for ages 5 – 12; and Biblical Choices which is designed for Christian school or homeschool bible study K – 6th grade.

Young People’s Standard was created to serve the Christian Endeavor movement for Christian Youth, founded in 1888. Six years later Young People’s Standard became The Lookout, a weekly Christian magazine for adults with features to apply their faith and study the Bible, still published weekly today.

The first edition of Training for Service was published in 1911, which in its several updated editions, is used as a Sunday school teacher training text.

In 1913, Standard Publishing became the first publisher of Vacation Bible School (VBS) materials with a five-week, all-day program.

Meanwhile, Christian Standard, the journal from which the company took its name, was published every week from 1866 till September 2012 when it introduced a new 64-page monthly edition. 

In 2014, Christian Standard introduced an app for digital editions available on smartphones and tablets.

Ownership history 
After 1872, the Erretts bought Carroll’s share of the company. Standard Publishing continued under the ownership and control of the Errett family until 1955 when it was sold to John Bolten Sr. Under his leadership it became a multinational corporation, eventually known as Standex International.

In July 2006, the Wicks Group, a New York-based private equity firm, acquired Standard Publishing. It was used as an imprint of New Mountain Learning.

In 2007, the company moved to modern offices on the north side of Cincinnati, where the successor company, Christian Standard Media, continues today.

In 2015, David C Cook acquired the Standard Publishing brand together with the company's Bible lesson commentary series, Sunday school curriculum and other church resources from New Mountain Learning. Christian Standard and The Lookout were not included in the deal and are published by Christian Standard Media.

In 2017, Christian Standard Media was acquired by The Solomon Foundation.

Bibliography

The Encyclopedia of the Stone-Campbell Movement, Paul M. Blowers, Anthony L. Dunnavant, Douglas A. Foster, D. Newell Williams, editors, copyright 2004 Wm. B. Eerdmans Publishing Co., Grand Rapids, Michigan. "Standard Publishing Company," p. 698. "Christian Standard," p. 197. "Butler, Burris (1909-1982), p. 103. "Errett, Isaac," (1820-1888), p. 301. "Lookout, The," p. 487.
Brian P Clark, "An Analysis of the Organizing Functions of the Christian Standard in the Restoration Movement Christian Churches/Churches of Christ" (M.A. Thesis, Wheaton College, 1998).
Ralph M. Small, "Standard Publishing: An Enduring Ministry," The Lookout, July 17, 1988, p. 9
Leonard G. Wymore, "5,200 Issues—and Still Counting!" The Lookout, March 6, 1994, p. 2
James B. North, Union in Truth, copyright 1994, James B. North. The Standard Publishing Company, Cincinnati, Ohio, pp. 238–39, 263.

References

External links

Christian literature
Book publishing companies based in Ohio
American companies established in 1913
Publishing companies established in 1913
1913 establishments in Ohio